Harald, Jarl of Bayeux or Harold was a pagan Norse chieftain who fought in support of Richard I, Duke of Normandy against Louis d'Outrimer. He is mentioned briefly by Flodoard as "Harald, who was in those days in charge around Bayeux."

References

10th-century French people
10th-century Normans